The Black Tusk is a stratovolcano and a pinnacle of volcanic rock in Garibaldi Provincial Park of British Columbia, Canada. It is particularly noticeable from the Sea-to-Sky Highway just south of Whistler, British Columbia. Distinctive and immediately identifiable, The Black Tusk is among the best known mountains in the Garibaldi Ranges of the Coast Mountains. The volcano is part of the Garibaldi Volcanic Belt which is a segment of the Canadian Cascade Arc, but it is not within the geographic boundary of the Cascade Range.

Indigenous
To Squamish people, this mountain is known as t'ak't'ak mu'yin tl'a in7in'a'xe7en.  In their language it means "Landing Place of the Thunderbird", speaking of the supernatural in7in'a'xe7en or Thunderbird.  The jagged shape of the mountain and its black colouring are said to come from the Thunderbird's lightning. The same is true for Mount Cayley, another stratovolcano farther north.

Geology
The Black Tusk is considered to be the remnant of an extinct andesitic stratovolcano which formed between about 1.3 and 1.1 million years ago. Following glacial dissection, renewed volcanism produced the lava dome and flow forming its summit about 170,000 years ago. According to Natural Resources Canada, The Black Tusk was "perhaps the conduit for lava within a cinder-rich volcano. The loose cinder has eroded, leaving only the hard lava core." The exposed lava rock of the core is loose and friable. It is also black, giving the mountain its name and character.

The mountain currently hosts two significant glaciers, in large cirques carved into the northeastern and northwestern flanks of the broad cone below the lava pinnacle. The glaciers are heavily covered in rocky debris due to the crumbling nature of the Tusk's rock.

The Black Tusk is a member of the chain of volcanic peaks that run from southwestern British Columbia to northern California. The peaks formed in the past 35 million years as the Juan de Fuca, Gorda and Explorer plates to its west have been subducting under the North American Plate at the Cascadia subduction zone.

Recreation
The Black Tusk's lower flanks and south summit are a popular backcountry hiking and scrambling destination.  Most hikers approach from the Taylor Meadows campground to the south near Garibaldi Lake, although there is a second route from the north that travels by way of Helm Lake.

The upper summit area at the top of the lava column can only be reached by scrambling up a short but exposed rock chimney to reach the south summit.  The true summit, only about a metre higher, lies just to the north across a precipitous drop.  It is rarely climbed, requiring a rappel of about  into a notch followed by a loose and dangerous reascent up the crumbling lava.  On the northern side of the north summit stands an isolated and intimidating rock formation known as the "Bishop's Mitre", which is rumoured to be unclimbed.

See also
Cascade Volcanoes
Garibaldi Volcanic Belt
List of volcanoes in Canada
Volcanism of Canada
Volcanism of Western Canada

References

External links

 
 
 
 Garibaldi Provincial Park (Black Tusk/Garibaldi Lake Area)
 
 Natural Resources Canada (Garibaldi: Where Fire Met Ice)

Religious places of the indigenous peoples of North America
Stratovolcanoes of Canada
Two-thousanders of British Columbia
Volcanoes of British Columbia
Subduction volcanoes
Squamish people
Sacred mountains
Extinct volcanoes
Pleistocene volcanoes
Sea-to-Sky Corridor
Polygenetic volcanoes
Garibaldi Ranges
Garibaldi Lake volcanic field